John Philip Kassebaum (October 24, 1932 – February 28, 2016) was an American attorney and art collector and former husband of U.S. Senator Nancy Kassebaum.

Born in Kansas City, Missouri, Kassebaum met Nancy Landon while attending the University of Michigan. He received a Juris Doctor from the University of Michigan School of Law. They married in 1956 and settled in Maize, Kansas, where they raised four children. They separated in 1975 and divorced in 1979. Kassebaum remarried to Llewellyn Hood, with whom he remained for the last 40 years of his life.

Beginning in the late 1950s, Kassebaum began collecting Medieval and Renaissance ceramics, including "lead- and tin-glazed pieces from Persia, Spain, Italy, France, Germany, the Netherlands and England".

Kassebaum later moved to Mount Pleasant, South Carolina, and became involved in historical preservation projects in Charleston, South Carolina, and Wichita, Kansas. He maintained law offices in Wichita and New York City and was "a frequent lecturer on ceramics and authored various articles on the subject".

His son William Kassebaum is a former member of the Kansas House of Representatives. Another son, filmmaker Richard Kassebaum, died of a brain tumor August 27, 2008, at the age of 47.

Kassebaum died in Charleston.

References

1932 births
2016 deaths
Lawyers from Kansas City, Missouri
Lawyers from New York City
Kansas lawyers
People from Mount Pleasant, South Carolina
American art collectors
University of Michigan Law School alumni
Landon family
20th-century American lawyers